Yulduz ('Star') was a weekly Uzbek language newspaper published in Afghanistan. Yulduz was published in Arabic script. The newspaper first appeared around 1980.

References

Weekly newspapers published in Afghanistan
Uzbek-language newspapers
1980 establishments in Afghanistan